Apiletria nervosa is a moth in the family Autostichidae. It was described by Henry Tibbats Stainton in 1867. It is found in Palestine and Libya.

References

Moths described in 1867
Apiletria